

See also
Cabinet (government)
Cabinet of Australia
Politics of Australia

References

External links
 List of female cabinet ministers of Australia

 
Ministers
Australia
Ministers
Government ministers